Paula Jean Myers-Pope (November 11, 1934 – June 9, 1995) was an American diver and Olympic medallist.

Life and career
Born in La Verne, California, Myers-Pope was a member of the USA Olympic Diving Team three times.
At 17 years of age, Paula Jean Myers won a silver medal in the 10 meter tower event at the 1952 Summer Olympics in Helsinki, Finland, a bronze medal in the same event at the 1956 Summer Olympics in Melbourne, Australia, and two silver medals at the 1960 Summer Olympics in Rome, Italy, one in the 3 meter springboard event and one in the 10M tower. 
She won two gold medals at the 1959 Pan American Games, in both platform and springboard. She has been inducted into the International Swimming Hall of Fame.

Myers-Pope attended Ohio State University in the mid 1950s, and ultimately graduated with a degree in dental hygiene from the University of Southern California and became a dental hygienist. She married Karl Pope (a USC basketball player) in 1958. The couple had two sons and three daughters.  In 1984 she retired from her career in dental hygiene, and proceeded to co-operate a family owned business, the Ojai Valley Racquet Club, with her husband in Ojai, California.  She died at the age of 60 in 1995.

See also
 List of members of the International Swimming Hall of Fame

References

External links

 

1934 births
1995 deaths
American female divers
Divers at the 1952 Summer Olympics
Divers at the 1956 Summer Olympics
Divers at the 1959 Pan American Games
Divers at the 1960 Summer Olympics
Medalists at the 1952 Summer Olympics
Medalists at the 1956 Summer Olympics
Medalists at the 1960 Summer Olympics
University of Southern California alumni
Olympic bronze medalists for the United States in diving
Olympic silver medalists for the United States in diving
Pan American Games gold medalists for the United States
Pan American Games medalists in diving
People from La Verne, California
Sportspeople from Los Angeles County, California
Medalists at the 1959 Pan American Games
20th-century American women
Dental hygienists